Visa requirements for Liberian citizens are administrative entry restrictions by the authorities of other states placed on citizens of the Republic of Liberia. As of 2 July 2019, Liberian citizens had visa-free or visa on arrival access to 47 countries and territories, ranking the Liberian passport 96th in terms of travel freedom (tied with passports from Burundi, Cameroon and Congo (Rep.)) according to the Henley Passport Index.

Visa requirements map

Visa requirements

Dependent, Disputed, or Restricted territories
Unrecognized or partially recognized countries

Dependent and autonomous territories

See also

Visa policy of Liberia
Liberian passport

References and Notes
References

Notes

Liberia
Foreign relations of Liberia